Hayle Academy (formerly Hayle Community School) is a coeducational secondary school located in Hayle in the English county of Cornwall.

Previously a community school administered by Cornwall Council, in November 2017 Hayle Community School converted to academy status and was renamed Hayle Academy. The school is now sponsored by the Truro & Penwith Academy Trust.

Hayle Academy offers GCSEs and BTECs as programmes of study for students.

History

The school opened as Hayle County Secondary Modern School in September 1957.

References

External links
 

Secondary schools in Cornwall
Academies in Cornwall
Hayle
1957 establishments in England